= Ruud de Lang =

Dutch herpetologist

- Born: 1936/1937; Netherlands
- Known for: Research on Indonesian snakes
- Notable work: The Snakes of Java, Bali and Surrounding Islands; The Snakes of Sulawesi
- Scientific career
- Fields: Herpetology

Ruud de Lang (born 1936 or 1937) is a Dutch herpetologist known for his extensive research on the snakes of Indonesia. His work focuses particularly on the taxonomy, distribution, and ecology of snakes from Java, Bali, and Sulawesi. Before devoting himself to zoological research, De Lang worked as a chemist in the pharmaceutical industry.

== Biography ==
=== Career ===
De Lang began his professional life as a chemist but developed a strong interest in herpetology, the study of amphibians and reptiles. He conducted numerous field studies in Indonesia, documenting and describing the diversity of the region’s snake fauna. His contributions have been published in specialized journals and several major reference works. He also wrote for the general public, like articles in newspaper NRC Handelsblad.

In 2012 the snake Calamophis ruuddelangi was named in honor of De Lang by John C. Murphy.

=== Personal life ===
As of 2014, De Lang lived in Rotterdam, the Netherlands.

== Reference works ==
De Lang is the author and co-author of several comprehensive guides to the snakes of Indonesia, published by Edition Chimaira in the Frankfurter Beiträge zur Naturkunde series.

- The Snakes of Sulawesi – A Field Guide to the Land Snakes of Sulawesi with Identification Keys (with Gernot Vogel). Edition Chimaira, 2005. ISBN 978-3930612852.

This field guide provides identification keys, colour photographs, and distribution maps for 54 species and subspecies of Sulawesi snakes.

- The Snakes of Java, Bali and Surrounding Islands. Edition Chimaira, 2017. ISBN 978-3-89973-525-3.

This 435-page monograph serves as the most detailed modern reference on the snakes of Java, Bali, and nearby islands.
